John Parke (1827–1900) was Union Army general in the American Civil War.

John Parke may also refer to:
John Parke (oboist) (1745–1829), English oboist
John Parke Custis (1754–1781), stepson of George Washington
John Parke (footballer) (1937–2011), Northern Irish international association football player

See also
John Park (disambiguation)